Dance!...Ya Know it! is a remix album by American R&B singer Bobby Brown, released in 1989. The album features remixes of various songs from his King of Stage and Don't Be Cruel albums as well as "On Our Own," Brown's hit single from the Ghostbusters II soundtrack.  "Every Little Hit Mega Mix," a medley of "Every Little Step," "On Our Own," "Don't Be Cruel," and "My Prerogative," was released as a single to promote the album but wasn't included on the album itself. The UK and European version of the megamix was titled "The Free Style Mega-mix" and was produced by Rita Liebrand; the Australian version, "The 'Every Little Hit' Mix," was released as a B-side on the European version of the Roni single.

Overview
Released mostly to cash in on the enormous commercial success of Don't Be Cruel, Dance!...Ya Know It! was released by MCA Records. Production was mostly handled by producers Antonio "L.A." Reid and Babyface, with additional production handled by Larry Blackmon, Gene Griffin, and Robert Brookins.

Track listing
 "Roni" (Babyface, Darnell Bristol) – 6:12
 "Rock Wit'cha" (Babyface, Bristol) – 5:13
 "Girl Next Door" (Melvin Wells) – 5:34
 "Don't Be Cruel" (Babyface, Reid, Daryl Simmons) – 5:38
 "Every Little Step" (Babyface, Reid) – 4:38
 "On Our Own" (Babyface, Reid, Simmons) – 5:12
 "Baby, I Wanna Tell You Something" (Larry Blackmon, Tomi Jenkins, Nathan Leftenant) – 4:18
 "My Prerogative" (Bobby Brown, Gene Griffin) – 5:12
 "Seventeen" (Robert Brookins, Tony Haynes) – 4:32

Personnel
 After 7 – Vocals (background)
 Babyface – Producer, Remixing
 David Bianco – Remixing
 Larry Blackmon – Producer
 Robert Brookins – Producer
 Bobby Brown – Vocals, Producer
 Jon Gass – Remixing
 Boris Granich – Editing
 Todd Gray – Photography
 Gene Griffin – Producer, Remixing
 Matthew Kasha – Engineer
 Kevin Kendricks – Associate Producer
 Thom "TK" Kidd – Engineer
 Chris Modig – Editing
 Taavi Mote – Engineer
 Dave Ogrin – Engineer, Associate Producer, Remixing, Mixing
 Donald Parks – Programming
 L.A. Reid – Producer, Remixing
 Michel Sauvage – Engineer
 Eddy Schreyer – Mastering
 Louis Silas Jr. – Producer, Executive Producer, Mixing
 Dale Sizer – Artwork
 Donnell Sullivan – Assistant Engineer
 Al Teller – Art Direction
 Ilene Weingard – Design
 Melvin Wells – Associate Producer
 Jon Wolfson – Engineer

Charts

Weekly charts

Year-end charts

Certifications

References

Bobby Brown albums
1989 remix albums
MCA Records remix albums
Albums produced by L.A. Reid
Albums produced by Babyface (musician)